Ishtadevata may refer to:
Iṣṭa-devatā (Hinduism), in Hinduism, an Ishta-deva or Ishta devata or Ishta-devatha is a term meaning "the God to which one prays most"
Iṣṭha-deva(tā) (Buddhism), in Vajrayana Buddhism, a Yidam (Tibetan) or Ishtadevata (Sanskrit) is a fully enlightened being who is the focus of personal meditation, during a retreat or for life